Chaliella doubledaii is a moth of the family Psychidae first described by John O. Westwood in 1854. It is found in Sri Lanka.

References

Moths of Asia
Moths described in 1854
Psychidae